The Bell of Huesca is a legend describing how Ramiro II of Aragon, the Monk, cut off the heads of twelve nobles who did not obey him. The legend is told in the 13th-century anonymous Aragonese work the Cantar de la campana de Huesca. 

After Alfonso I of Aragon died in 1134 leaving no descendants, his brother Ramiro, bishop of Roda de Isábena, inherited the Kingdom of Aragón, one of the states of the Iberian Peninsula. At that time the kingdom had serious domestic and foreign problems.

The Chronicle of San Juan de la Peña from the 14th century tells how Ramiro II became so concerned about his nobles abusing his patience that he sent a herald to the Abbey of Saint-Pons-de-Thomières to ask for advice from his former master.

The herald was shown the abbey garden where the old monk removed the heads from roses that stood out from the rest (in other versions of the story, the roses are replaced by cabbages). The herald is then told to tell the king what he has seen.

After the heralds return, Ramiro II sent a message to the chief noble, saying that he wanted help in order to build a bell that could be heard all over Aragón. As the nobles arrived, the king cut off their heads, building a circle with the heads, with the chief noble's head suspended as the bell clapper. The result was then shown as an example to others.

References
Alvar, Carlos y Manuel ALVAR, Épica medieval española, Madrid, Cátedra, 1997. 
Laliena Corbera, Carlos, La campana de Huesca, Zaragoza, CAI (CAI 100, nº 69), 2000.  
Soria Andreu, Francisca,  «Preliminary Study» to: Lope de Vega, La campana de Aragón, Zaragoza, Institución «Fernando el Católico», 2001, págs. 5-70.

External links

Ingrid Vindel Pérez, «Análisis y estudio del material cronístico en una comedia de senectud: La campana de Aragón», Espéculo. Revista de estudios literarios. Universidad Complutense de Madrid, 2004.
Links to Huesca Museum of Province

Spanish legends
Huesca